Descurainia is a genus of plants in the family Brassicaceae which are known commonly as the tansymustards. The genus name commemorates French botanist and herbalist François Descurain (1658–1749). The plants are similar in appearance to other mustards, sending up long erect stems and bearing small yellow or whitish flowers. Many species are noxious weeds. Some species are toxic to livestock and become a nuisance when they grow in grazing fields. Plants of this genus are found worldwide in temperate regions. Descurainia sophia, (flixweed or herb sophia), is the type species of Descurainia.

Selected species:
Descurainia antarctica - Tierra del Fuego tansymustard
Descurainia bourgaeana
Descurainia californica - Sierra tansymustard
Descurainia incana - mountain tansymustard
Descurainia obtusa - blunt tansymustard
Descurainia paradisa - paradise tansymustard
Descurainia pinnata - western tansymustard
Descurainia ramosissima - Villa Grove tansymustard
Descurainia sophia - flixweed, herb-Sophia or tansy
Descurainia sophioides - northern tansymustard
Descurainia torulosa - Wind River tansymustard

References

External links 
 Jepson Manual Treatment

 
Brassicaceae genera